Presentation Brothers' College is a prominent Roman Catholic secondary school for boys in St. George's, Grenada. It was founded by the Presentation Brothers in 1947.

Notable alumni
Maurice Bishop
Keith Mitchell
George Brizan
Dickon Mitchell

References

Schools in Grenada